R21, R-21 or R.21 may refer to:

Military 
 R-21 (missile), a Soviet submarine-launched ballistic missile
 , an aircraft carrier of the Royal Australian Navy
 , a destroyer of the Royal Navy
 , a submarine of the United States Navy

Roads 
 R-21 regional road (Montenegro)
 R21 (South Africa)
 R21 highway (Russia)

Science and medicine 
 Dichlorofluoromethane, a refrigerant
 R21: Harmful in contact with skin, a risk phrase
 R21/Matrix-M a Malaria vaccine
 Small nucleolar RNA R21

Other uses 
 R21 (New York City Subway car)
 Kwanyama dialect
 Renault 21, a French family car
 Tumansky R-21, a Soviet turbojet engine